Masao Yoshida (born 30 November 1932) is a Japanese sailor. He competed in the 5.5 Metre event at the 1964 Summer Olympics.

References

External links
 

1932 births
Living people
Japanese male sailors (sport)
Olympic sailors of Japan
Sailors at the 1964 Summer Olympics – 5.5 Metre
Place of birth missing (living people)